The following lists events that happened during 1884 in the Kingdom of Belgium.

Incumbents

Monarch: Leopold II
Prime Minister:
 until 16 June: Walthère Frère-Orban
 16 June–26 October: Jules Malou 
 starting 26 October: Auguste Marie François Beernaert

Events
 Belgian State Railways Type 25 taken into service
 15 May – North Sea Fisheries Convention (signed 1882) comes into effect
 16 June – Jules Malou replaces Walthère Frère-Orban as Prime Minister 
 25 May – Provincial elections
 June and July – Belgian general election, 1884
 5 July – Paris Convention for the Protection of Industrial Property obtains legal force
 26 October – Auguste Beernaert replaces Jules Malou as Prime Minister 
 End of the First School War between confessional Catholic Party and secularist Liberal Party

Publications

Periodicals
 Annales de la Société entomologique de Belgique, vol. 28.
 La Belgique Horticole, vol. 34, edited by Édouard Morren.
 Bibliographie de la Belgique, vol. 10.
 Bulletins de l'Académie royale des sciences, des lettres et des beaux-arts de Belgique (Brussels, M. Hayez).
 La Jeune Belgique, vol. 3.
 Jurisprudence du port d'Anvers, vol. 29.
 Le Magasin littéraire et scientifique begins publication.
 Mémoires de l'Académie royale des sciences, des lettres et des beaux-arts de Belgique, vol. 45.
 Messager des sciences historiques.
 Le Mouvement Géographique begins publication.
 Le Patriote begins publication.

Books
 Maria Doolaeghe, Jongste dichtbundel
 Louis Hymans, Bruxelles à travers les âges (3 vols., Brussels, Bruylant-Christophe)
 Isidoor Teirlinck and Reimond Stijns, Arm Vlaanderen
 Léon Vanderkindere, L'Université de Bruxelles: Notice historique, faite à la demande du Conseil d'Administration (Brussels, P. Weissenbruch)

Art and architecture

Exhibitions
 February – First exhibition of Les XX opens

Paintings
 Théo van Rysselberghe, Four Breakwaters
 James Ensor, The Rooftops of Ostend

Births
 19 January – Valerius Geerebaert, Redemptorist (did 1957)
 17 February – Arthur Vanderpoorten, politician (died 1945)
 21 March – Paul Demasy, playwright (died 1974)
 26 May – Félix Goblet d'Alviella, newspaperman (died 1957)
 3 June – Julius Raes, Capuchin archivist (died 1961)
 8 June – Paul Ermens, colonial officer (died 1957)
 13 June – Jean Brusselmans, painter (died 1953)
 6 September – Julien Lahaut, communist (died 1950)
 22 November – Oscar Sevrin, missionary (died 1975)
 30 November – Yvan Goor, motorcyclist (died 1958)
 10 December – Robert Gillon, politician (died 1972)
 20 December – Jean-Baptiste Sipido, anarchist (died 1959)

Deaths

 7 April – Maria Doolaeghe (born 1803), poet
 22 May – Louis Hymans (born 1829), writer and politician
 10 July – Henri Delmotte (born 1822), writer
 23 July – Louis Galesloot (born 1821), archivist
 5 November – Edouard d'Huart (born 1800), politician
 1 December – Louis-Gustave Amelot (born 1857), engineer
 4 December – Frédéric Faber (born 1837), bibliophile
 28 December – Edmond Hanssens (born 1843), colonial administrator

References

 
1880s in Belgium
Belgium
Years of the 19th century in Belgium
Belgium